The International Mango Festival, held annually in Delhi, India during early summer, is a two-day festival showcasing mangoes.  It has been held since 1987.

It is organised by the Delhi Tourism and Transportation Development Corporation (DTTDC) in collaboration with the Agricultural and Processed Food Products Export Development Authority, the National Horticultural Board and the New Delhi Municipal Council.  As in recent past years, the festival was held in the Talkatora Indoor Stadium.

A tourism official explained:  More than 50 mango growers from across the country, mainly from Uttar Pradesh, Bihar, Gujarat and Delhi, were given an interactive platform to present the 'king of fruits' [...] The visitors, who normally think mango has just five or six varieties, were educated through quizzes and competitions about the huge variety of the fruit grown and innumerable possibilities of using mango in cuisine. They also enjoyed colourful entertainment programmes of music and dance. [...] It is an informal and international platform with a two-fold approach, to promote tourism as well as mango export.

More than 550 varieties and cultivars of mango are featured in the festival for visitors to view and taste.  Among these are alphonso, mallika, amrapali, himsagar, malda, balia, chorasya, dhaman, dhoon, fazia, gelchia, nigarin kheria, ruchika and shamasi.  Notable chefs from five star hotels like the Maurya Sheraton, Taj Mahal Palace & Tower, Inter-Continental Hotel, Marriott India, Qutub Hotel and Claridges around India demonstrate the preparation of assorted recipes made with mango.

The festival is also an opportunity for agro-industries and food industries processing mangoes into jams, pickles, fruit juice and canned fruit to display their products.

Activities in the festival include cultural programmes and recreational events like a mango eating competition for women, mango slogan writing, a demonstration of mango carving, a magic show, and a quiz about mangoes.  For the mango judging competition, there are various categories and a minimum of seven ripe mangoes are required for competing in each. There is also a prize given for biggest mango.
In describing International Mango Festival, a reporter for the BBC said: Some visitors found the culinary preparations - unusual in a country where the fruit is primarily eaten uncooked - interesting.  India exports about 40,000 metric tonnes of mangoes to 80 countries and the annual revenue earned from exporting mangoes and mango products reaches $85 million.  Festival organisers hope the event will help to raise these figures significantly.  Hindu mythology in India gives the mango an aura of mystique as a symbol of the joy of life.

Other festivals
Mango festivals are also held elsewhere in the world such as one hosted by Fairchild Tropical Gardens in Miami, Florida, United States, another in Cebu, Philippines and a third in Negril, Jamaica.

9 August 2015 was the 1st International Mango Festival Canada in Mississauga, Ontario
Organized by Canadian Friend's Front (CFF) & United Canadian Pakistani Volunteers (UCPV)

Mango is an international fruit favored by many countries and loved by many communities in the city of Mississauga. We have chosen Mango to be a center attraction of this event due to diverse and rich cultural communities of Mississauga and keeping their love for it in mind. Almost every community living in Mississauga either produce Mango in their native country or import it, keeping this in mind International Mango Festival Canada is aiming to represent mango from each mango producing region in the world. We believe it is one of the most common factors between the communities here and once we hold such festival it will bring people out and engage them. We would like to engage local city vendors and businesses to participate and showcase their services and merchandise related to mango to support local economy. There has never been such event in Canada and this event will bring city of Mississauga on the map more prominently.

1st Outdoor #Mango Festival Canada was scheduled for 4 June 2016 @ #Celebration Square ( City Hall ) Mississauga. This event was organized by CFFI ( Canadian Friends Front Intl'l & Universal Promotions. Entry was free.

Notes

Fruit festivals
Mangoes
Food and drink festivals in India
Festivals in Delhi
Tourist attractions in Delhi
Fairs in Delhi
2nd Outdoor Mango Festival Canada will be on June14, 2019 and June15, 2019 at the Celebration Square Mississauga Canada. Free Entry